Kožmani is a settlement on the southeastern outskirts of Ajdovščina in the Littoral region of Slovenia.

References

External links 
Kožmani at Geopedia

Populated places in the Municipality of Ajdovščina